Fabián Ruiz Peña (born 3 April 1996), simply known as Fabián, is a Spanish professional footballer who plays as a central midfielder for Ligue 1 club Paris Saint-Germain and the Spain national team.

Club career

Real Betis

Early years
Born in Los Palacios y Villafranca, Seville, Andalusia, Fabián joined Real Betis' youth setup in 2004, aged eight, after starting it out at EF La Unión de Los Palacios. He was promoted to the reserves in July 2014, and made his senior debut on 21 September, coming on as a second half substitute in a 4–1 home loss against Marbella in the Segunda División B championship.

Fabián played his first match as a professional on 16 December, replacing Xavi Torres in the 51st minute of a 1–0 Segunda División away win against Lugo. He appeared in six matches during the season, as his side achieved promotion to La Liga as champions.

Fabián made his debut in the main category of Spanish football on 23 August 2015, coming on as a substitute for Alfred N'Diaye in a 1–1 home draw against Villarreal.

Loan to Elche
On 23 December of the following year he renewed his contract until 2019, and was immediately loaned to Elche in the second level. He scored his first professional goal on 17 March 2017, netting the first in a 3–1 away win against Gimnàstic de Tarragona.

Fabián contributed with 18 appearances for the side, suffering team relegation.

Breakthrough
Upon returning, Fabián became a regular starter under new manager Quique Setién, scoring his first goal in the top tier on 25 September 2017 in a 4–0 home routing of Levante. The following 31 January, he renewed his contract until 2023, setting his buyout clause at €30 million.

On 30 April 2018, Fabián scored the winning goal for Betis as they secured UEFA Europa League qualification for the 2018–19 season following a 2–1 home win over Málaga.

Napoli
On 5 July 2018, Fabián joined Napoli on a five-year contract until 2023 with Napoli reportedly paying Fabián's €30 million buyout clause. He made his debut on 16 September in a Champions League group game away to Red Star Belgrade, playing the full 90 minutes of a goalless draw. Ten days later he played his first Serie A match and first at the Stadio San Paolo, a 3–0 win over Parma.

Paris Saint-Germain 
On 30 August 2022, Fabián signed for Ligue 1 club Paris Saint-Germain on a five-year contract. He made his debut as a substitute in a 1–0 league victory over Brest at the Parc des Princes on 10 September.

International career
After representing Spain at under-19 and under-21 levels, Fabián was called up to the full side by manager Luis Enrique on 15 March 2019, for two UEFA Euro 2020 qualifying matches against Norway and Malta.

He made his debut on 7 June 2019 in a Euro 2020 qualifier against Faroe Islands, as a 74th-minute substitute for Isco.

On 24 May 2021, Fabián was included in Luis Enrique's 24-man squad for UEFA Euro 2020.

Style of play
A left-footed central midfielder, Fabián is known for his vision, passing, ball control and dribbling skills, as well as his tactical versatility, and can play in a number of formations,
such as 4–4–2, 4–3–3, and 4–2–3–1. He can also play as a defensive midfielder or an attacking midfielder.

Career statistics

Club

International

Honours
Real Betis
Segunda División: 2014–15

Napoli
Coppa Italia: 2019–20
Spain U21
UEFA European Under-21 Championship: 2019
Individual
UEFA European Under-21 Championship Golden Player: 2019
UEFA European Under-21 Championship Team of the Tournament: 2019

References

External links

 
 
 
 
 
 

1996 births
Living people
People from Los Palacios y Villafranca
Sportspeople from the Province of Seville
Spanish footballers
Footballers from Andalusia
Association football wingers
Betis Deportivo Balompié footballers
Real Betis players
Elche CF players
S.S.C. Napoli players
Paris Saint-Germain F.C. players
Segunda División B players
Segunda División players
La Liga players
Serie A players

Spain youth international footballers
Spain under-21 international footballers
Spain international footballers
UEFA Euro 2020 players
Spanish expatriate footballers
Spanish expatriate sportspeople in Italy
Expatriate footballers in Italy
Spanish expatriate sportspeople in France
Expatriate footballers in France